The Panasonic Leica D Vario-Elmar 14-50mm F3.8-5.6 Mega OIS is an interchangeable camera lens announced by Panasonic on August 30, 2007.

References
http://www.dpreview.com/products/panasonic/lenses/panasonic_leica_14-50_3p8-5p6_ois/specifications

14-050mm F3.8-5.6 Mega OIS
Camera lenses introduced in 2007